Hotel Valhalla: Guide to the Norse Worlds (also known as For Magnus Chase: Hotel Valhalla Guide to the Norse Worlds) is a collection of short stories about Norse mythology. The book is a supplementary work in the  Magnus Chase and the Gods of Asgard series, written by Rick Riordan. It was released on August 16, 2016 and was published in United States by Disney Hyperion, in United Kingdom by Puffin Books and was also translated into five languages to date.

Hotel Valhalla features characters from Norse mythology, including Norse gods, who narrate their stories in a humorous retelling. The book was praised for its humour and writing style, but criticized for its lack of illustrations.

Plot

The book opens with Helgi, manager of Valhalla's announcement. It is then followed by Hunding, servant of Valhalla, who introduces the reader to Norse deities and creatures.

Characters
 Baldr
 Frey
 Sumarbrander
 Thor
 Odin
 Tyr

Reception
Horn Book Magazine writes "Written as a handbook for new einherjar, Odin's warriors in Valhalla, this irreverent volume uses wry humor and a variety of devices (interviews, dossier-style highlights, first-person confessionals, a rap battle) to overview the gods and gossip of Norse mythology. Heroic-looking black-and-white sketches add visual interest, while an appendix contains a pronunciation guide. Hints throughout point to the next Magnus Chase installment." Hypable writes "In  fact, it reads a lot like J.K. Rowling’s Tales of Beedle the Bard or Fantastic Beasts and Where to Find Them. Riordan clearly has his own voice, though, and the myriad of characters who step forward to write entries in Hotel Valhalla quickly make a name for themselves." A staff reviewer for YA Books Central expressed sadness for the lack of drawings.

References

2016 short story collections
Hyperion Books books
Magnus Chase and the Gods of Asgard
Fantasy short story collections
Puffin Books books